The 2003 Siebel Open was a men's tennis tournament played on indoor hard courts at the HP Pavilion at San Jose in San Jose, California in the United States that was part of the International Series of the 2003 ATP Tour. It was the 115th edition of the tournament and was held from February 10 through February 16, 2003. First-seeded Andre Agassi won the singles title.

Finals

Singles

 Andre Agassi defeated  Davide Sanguinetti 6–3, 6–1
 It was Agassi's 2nd title of the year and the 57th of his career.

Doubles

 Hyung-Taik Lee /  Vladimir Voltchkov defeated  Paul Goldstein /  Robert Kendrick 7–5, 4–6, 6–3
 It was Lee's 2nd title of the year and the 2nd of his career. It was Voltchkov's only title of the year and the 1st of his career.

References

Siebel Open
SAP Open
Siebel Open
Siebel Open
Siebel Open